E175 may refer to:
 Edible gold, a food additive coded E 175 in the Codex Alimentarius standards
 The Embraer ERJ-175 jet airplane